Mark Mikhaylovich Deutch (also transliterated as Deutsch, Deich and Deitch; 26 January 1945 – 2 May 2012) was a Russian journalist and columnist for Moskovskij Komsomolets. He became widely known while working with Radio Free Europe/Radio Liberty. He authored several books on politics.

Bibliography
 «Память» как она есть / Марк Дейч, Леонид Журавлёв. — М.: Владивосток: МП «Цунами», 1991. — 188 с. — 
 На «Свободе»: [Ст., очерки и репортажи коммент. радиостанции «Свобода»] / Марк Дейч. — М.: Культ. инициатива: Феникс, 1992. — 249 с. — 
 Коричневые / Марк Дейч; Рис. А. Меринова. — М.: ТЕРРА — Кн. клуб, 2003 (ОАО Яросл. полигр. комб.). — 428 с. — 
(Literally translated as "The Browns", with the intended meaning "Brownshirts"), a book about neonazism in Russia
 Клио в багровых тонах: Солженицын и евреи / Марк Дейч. — М.: Детектив-Пресс, 2006 (Тверь: Тверской полиграфкомбинат). — 221 с. — (Детектив-Пресс. Расследование издательства). —

References

Russian journalists
Russian writers
1945 births
2012 deaths
Deaths by drowning
Place of birth missing
Place of death missing
Burials in Troyekurovskoye Cemetery